A photographer is a person who takes photographs using a camera.

Photographer(s) may also refer to:
 Photographer (film), a 2006 Malayalam drama
 The Photographer, a chamber opera by composer Philip Glass
 The Photographer (1953 film), a 1953 Mexican comedy thriller film
 The Photographer (1974 film), a 1974 film
 The Photographer (2000 film), a 2000 film directed by Jeremy Stein
 The Photographer (comics), about a Médecins Sans Frontières mission during the height of the Soviet war in Afghanistan

See also
 List of photographers
 Photograph (disambiguation)
 Photographer of Dreams, a concert programme of Russian pop star Valery Leontiev